Connecticut's 3rd congressional district is a congressional district in the U.S. state of Connecticut. Located in the central part of the state, the district includes the city of New Haven and its surrounding suburbs.

Principal cities include: Middletown, New Haven, and Stratford.

The district is currently represented by Democrat Rosa DeLauro.

Characteristics
The 3rd congressional district has existed since 1837, having been organized from the at-large congressional district. It is centered on New Haven and its suburbs. The district comprises four-fifths of New Haven County, a small portion of Middlesex County, including most of Middletown and most of Stratford and a small section of Shelton in Fairfield County.

New Haven and its surrounding suburbs are largely Democratic, making the district very Democratic in local and federal elections. Among districts statewide, only the 1st congressional district is considered more Democratic. Four Democratic strongholds, New Haven, Hamden, Middletown, and West Haven, comprise 40% of the total district population.  Since 2000, Democratic presidential candidates have carried the district by a margin of 26 points.  John Kerry, being the exception, still defeated George W. Bush by a comfortable 14 points. On the state level, moderate Republicans John G. Rowland and M. Jodi Rell have also carried the district.

Since 1933, Democrats have held the district for all but six terms (1943–45, 1947–49, 1953–59, 1981–83). Between 1972-1988, every Republican nominee for President carried the district, along with the state itself.  In his sole run for a House seat, Joe Lieberman, lost the district to a Republican in 1980.

Towns in the districtFairfield County – Shelton (part) and Stratford.New Haven County – Ansonia, Beacon Falls, Bethany, Branford, Derby, East Haven, Guilford, Hamden, Milford, Naugatuck, New Haven, North Branford, North Haven, Orange, Prospect, Seymour, Wallingford, Waterbury (part), West Haven, and Woodbridge.Middlesex County''' – Durham, Middlefield, and Middletown (part).

Voter registration

Recent presidential elections

Recent elections

1990

1992

1994

1996

1998

2000

2002

2004

2006

2008

2010

2012

2014

2016

2018

2020

List of members representing the district

References

 Congressional Biographical Directory of the United States 1774–present

3
New Haven County, Connecticut
Middlesex County, Connecticut
History of Fairfield County, Connecticut
Political history of Connecticut
Constituencies established in 1837
1837 establishments in Connecticut